Eoophyla menglensis is a moth in the family Crambidae. It was described by H.-H. Li, X.-C. An, Y.-Y. Li and M.-T. Liu in 1995. It is found in Yunnan, China.

References

Eoophyla
Moths described in 1995